Camillo Innocenti (14 June 1871 – 4 January 1961)  was an Italian painter born in Rome.

Biography
After he studied in Lyceum, after 1889 he joined the studios of Antonio Mancini in Rome and Domenico Morelli in Naples. After a visit to Spain in 1901, he painted local folk subjects from Abruzzo (1904) and Sardinia (1908). At the 1903 Venice Biennale, he displayed his divisionist works with an attention to social topics, alongside Giacomo Balla, Enrico Lionne, and Arturo Noci. After 1906 he began to focus on painting mainly feminine figures. He was named academic at the Academy of St Luke, and in 1912 he joined the Secessione Romana. He later traveled to Paris and Monaco.

References

1871 births
1961 deaths
19th-century Italian painters
Italian male painters
20th-century Italian painters
20th-century Italian male artists
Italian genre painters
19th-century Italian male artists